A Matter of Taste is the seventh studio album by Russian pop singer Valery Leontiev. It was released in 1990. The album was re-released in 2012 by World Media Alliance.

Track listing 
 Matter of Taste (music and lyrics O.Gazmanov)
 Figure (A. Kosinski — A. Kastrov)
 Ostankino Tower (music and lyrics by S. Krylov)
 Telephone Boogie (music and lyrics Yury G. Chernavsky)
 Hobbies (music and lyrics Gazmanov)
 A Bird in a Cage (Morozov — Morozov)
 Black Sea (music and lyrics by S. Krylov)
 Model Boy (music and lyrics by I. Talkov)
 Old Man (music and lyrics by A. Mishina)

References

External links 
 

1990 albums
Valery Leontiev albums